Ralph Lord Roy (1928 – 2020) was a Methodist pastor and author, as well as a Freedom Rider and activist in the Civil rights movement.

Background 
Ralph Lord Roy was born on September 30, 1928 in St. Albans, Vermont. He was the son of Howard Allen and Olive Lydia (Corliss) Roy. He graduated from Swarthmore College in 1950, then received his Master of Arts from Union Theological Seminary in 1952.

After his ordination, he served several churches in New York City and Connecticut.

Roy's first book, Apostles of Discord, began as his doctoral thesis. It discussed some of the racist elements hiding within American Protestantism and was the first published history of the emerging Christian Identity movement.

Civil rights movement 
Roy was part of the Interfaith Freedom Ride from Washington, D.C. to Tallahassee, Florida June 1316, 1961, an act that resulted in jail time.

After meeting with Martin Luther King Jr. in the summer of 1962, Roy and Israel Dresner organized a "prayer pilgrimage" on August 28, 1962 in Albany, Georgia. The pilgrimage resulted in the largest jailing of clergy in American history.

Writer and author 
Ralph Lord Roy was a writer and an author.

For 20 years, he was a columnist covering social, political, and religious topics for the Record Journal in Meriden, Connecticut.

Books 
Apostles of Discord (1953)
Communism and the Churches (1960)

References 

1929 births
2020 deaths
American Methodist clergy
Freedom Riders
People from St. Albans, Vermont
Activists from Vermont
Swarthmore College alumni
Union Theological Seminary (New York City) alumni
American columnists